The 1892–93 Ottawa Hockey Club season was the club's eighth season of play. The Club would play in the Amateur Hockey Association of Canada (AHAC) and the Ontario Hockey Association (OHA) leagues. Ottawa placed second in the AHAC championship. Ottawa won the OHA championship for the third year in a row after the Toronto Granites defaulted.

OHA season

Results 

The Toronto Granite Club, scheduled to play the final in Ottawa, defaulted, giving the championship to Ottawa. The Granites suggested putting together a team composed of players from all Toronto teams. However, the Granites failed to organize the team and the game did not take place.

AHAC season 

The AHAC adopted a new round-robin format for the regular season, with the league winner to be the inaugural winner of the Stanley Cup. Each team played two games against other opponents.

Ottawa lost to the Montreal Victorias in the opening game of the schedule on January 7. It would be the Victorias only win of the season and was the margin between Ottawa in second and the Montreal Hockey Club in first place. Ottawa split its series with Montreal, handing Montreal its only loss. After the season, Ottawa challenged Montreal to a final playoff, but this was refused.

Final standings

Results

Player statistics

Goaltending averages

Scoring leaders

Roster 
 Albert Morel (goal)
 Reginald Bradley
 William Dey
 Chauncy Kirby
 Halder Kirby
 Jack Kerr
 Bert Russel
 Weldy Young

Source: Coleman, pp. 9–10

See also 
 1893 AHAC season

References and notes 
 
 

Ottawa Senators (original) seasons
Ottawa